The Flute sonata in E minor (HWV 359b) was composed (c. 1724) by George Frideric Handel for flute and basso continuo. The work is also referred to as Opus 1 No. 1b, and was first published in 1732 by Walsh. Other catalogues of Handel's music have referred to the work as HG xxvii,6; and HHA iv/3,10.

The sonata was originally composed as a violin sonata in D minor (HWV 359a).

Of the two sonatas in the Chrysander edition as Opus 1 Sonata I, this one (Sonata Ib) is the one in the Walsh edition (where it is called Sonata I). Chrysander's Sonata Ia was compiled from manuscript sources. Chrysander's Sonata Ia and Sonata Ib have their first and fourth movements in common.

A typical performance of the work takes about seven minutes.

Movements
The work consists of four movements:

(Movements do not contain repeat markings unless indicated. The number of bars is taken from the Chrysander edition, and is the raw number in the manuscript—not including repeat markings.)

See also
Handel flute sonatas
List of solo sonatas by George Frideric Handel
XV Handel solo sonatas (publication by Chrysander)
Handel solo sonatas (publication by Walsh)

References

Flute sonatas by George Frideric Handel
1724 compositions
Compositions in E minor